George Spencer-Churchill, 5th Duke of Marlborough FSA (6 March 1766 – 5 March 1840), styled Marquess of Blandford until 1817, was a British nobleman, politician, peer, and collector of antiquities and books.

He was the first one to specifically use the surname "Spencer-Churchill"; Churchill was the name of the first Duke.

Background and education
Spencer-Churchill was the eldest son of George Spencer, 4th Duke of Marlborough, and Lady Caroline Russell, daughter of John Russell, 4th Duke of Bedford. Francis Spencer, 1st Baron Churchill, was his younger brother. He was educated at Eton between 1776 and 1783 and at Christ Church, Oxford, between 1784 and 1786, where he graduated on 9 December 1786 as a Bachelor of Arts, later proceeding automatically to Master of Arts. He was later given the honorary degree of Doctor of Laws (D.C.L.) from the University on 20 June 1792.

Career
Lord Blandford represented Oxfordshire in parliament as a Whig between 1790 and 1796 and Tregony as a Tory between 1802 and 1806. From 1804 to 1806, he served under William Pitt the Younger as a Lord of the Treasury. The latter year he was summoned to the House of Lords through a writ of acceleration in his father's barony of Spencer of Wormleighton. During this time, he lived in Berkshire, at Remenham and Hurst. From 1798, he resided at Whiteknights Park at Earley, near Reading, where he became famous for his extravagant collecting of antiquities, especially books. He was invested as a Fellow of the Society of Antiquaries (FSA) on 8 December 1803.

Although the Marquess was born and baptised with the name of George Spencer, soon after succeeding to the Dukedom of Marlborough, he had it legally changed on 26 May 1817 to George Spencer-Churchill. This illustrious name did not, however, save him from his mounting debts, and his estates were seized and his collections sold. He retired to Blenheim Palace, where he lived the remainder of his life off a small annuity granted to the first Duke by Queen Anne.

The diarist Harriet Arbuthnot wrote one of her most scathing comments about the Duke following a visit to Blenheim in 1824:

Family
Marlborough married Lady Susan Stewart (1767–1841), daughter of John Stewart, 7th Earl of Galloway, on 15 September 1791. They had four children:

 George Spencer-Churchill, 6th Duke of Marlborough (1793–1857)
 Lord Charles Spencer-Churchill (1794–1840), married Ethelred Catherine Benett and had issue.
 Reverend Lord George Henry Spencer-Churchill (1796–1828), married Elizabeth Martha Nares; after his death, she married in 1834 the barrister William Whateley.
 Lord Henry John Spencer-Churchill (1797–1840). Died and buried in Macao 2 June 1840, whilst as Captain of HBM Ship Druid.

Winston Churchill was the duke's great-great-grandson.

Illegitimate children:

 John Tustian (1799–1873).

Illegitimate children:

 Ann Spencer (1802-1880)

Illegitimate children by Matilda Glover (1802–1876)

 Georgina Matilda (1819–1898)
 Caroline Augusta (1821–1905)
 Elizabeth (Ellen) (1823–1878), married novelist Robert Mackenzie Daniel (1813–1847), and became a novelist herself .
 Henry Spencer (1831–1831)
 George (?)
 Henry (?)

The Duke died in March 1840, aged 73, at Blenheim Palace and was buried there in the vault beneath the chapel on 13 March 1840. His eldest son George, Marquess of Blandford, succeeded in the title. The Duchess of Marlborough died at Park Lane, Mayfair, London, in April 1841, aged 73.

Literature
 Mary Soames; The Profligate Duke: George Spencer Churchill, Fifth Duke of Marlborough, and His Duchess (1987)

References

External links

Royal berkshire History: George Spencer-Churchill, Duke of Marlborough

1766 births
1840 deaths
People educated at Eton College
George Spencer-Churchill, 5th Duke of Marlborough
105
Members of the Parliament of Great Britain for English constituencies
British MPs 1790–1796
UK MPs 1802–1806
UK MPs who inherited peerages
People from Earley
People from Hurst, Berkshire
People from Remenham
Members of the Parliament of the United Kingdom for constituencies in Cornwall
English book and manuscript collectors
Fellows of the Society of Antiquaries of London